T.H. Tse is a Hong Kong academic who is a professor and researcher in program testing and debugging. He is ranked internationally as the second most prolific author in metamorphic testing.

According to Bruel et al., "Research on integrated formal and informal techniques can trace its roots to the work of T.H. Tse in the mid-eighties." The application areas of his research include object-oriented software, services computing, pervasive computing, concurrent systems, imaging software, and numerical programs. In addition, he creates graphic designs for non-government organizations.

Tse received the PhD from the London School of Economics in 1988 under the supervision of Frank Land and Ian Angell. He was a Visiting Fellow at the University of Oxford in 1990 and 1992. He is currently an honorary professor in computer science at The University of Hong Kong after retiring from his full professorship in 2014. He was decorated with an MBE by Queen Elizabeth II of the United Kingdom.

In 2013, an international event entitled "The Symposium on Engineering Test Harness" was held in Nanjing, China "in honor of the retirement of T.H. Tse". The acronym of the symposium was "TSE-TH".

In 2017 to 2020, Tse served as the intermediary for the fundraising of $140 million for The University of Hong Kong to establish the Tam Wing Fan Innovation Wings I and II in the Faculty of Engineering.

In 2019, Tse and team applied metamorphic testing to verify the robustness of citation indexing services, including Scopus and Web of Science. The innovative method, known as "metamorphic robustness testing", revealed that the presence of simple hyphens in the titles of scholarly papers adversely affects citation counts and journal impact factors, regardless of the quality of the publications. This "bizarre new finding", as well as the refutation by Web of Science and the clarification by Tse, was reported in ScienceAlert, Nature Index, Communications of the ACM, Psychology Today, and The Australian.

In 2021, Tse and team were selected as the Grand Champion of the Most Influential Paper Award by the Journal of Systems and Software for their 2010 paper. According to Google Scholar, the journal ranks no. 3 in h5-index among international publication venues in software systems.

Books 
  

 T.H. Tse, A Unifying Framework for Structured Analysis and Design Models: An Approach using Initial Algebra Semantics and Category Theory, Cambridge Tracts in Theoretical Computer Science, vol. 11, Cambridge University Press, Cambridge. Ebook edition (2010).  Paperback edition (2009).  Hardcover edition (1991).

Selected publications

References 

Year of birth missing (living people)
Living people
Computer scientists
Software engineering researchers
Software testing people
Academic staff of the University of Hong Kong
Alumni of the London School of Economics
Fellows of the British Computer Society
Hong Kong people with disabilities